Sergei Shumakov (born 4 September 1992) is a Russian professional ice hockey forward who is currently playinf for HC Dinamo Minsk in the Kontinental Hockey League (KHL).

Playing career
Undrafted, Shumakov made his Kontinental Hockey League (KHL) debut with HC Sibir Novosibirsk during the 2011–12 season.

After the 2016–17 season, his seventh year in the KHL with Novosibirsk, Shumakov was traded along with Maxim Shalunov and Konstantin Okulov to HC CSKA Moscow in exchange for Alexander Sharov and financial compensation on the opening day of free agency on 1 May 2017. In his first season with CSKA in 2017–18, Shumakov responded to his change of scenery in recording a personal high 23 assists and 40 points in 47 regular season games.

On 27 August 2018, CSKA Moscow terminated their contract with Shumakov prior to the 2018–19 season. The following week, with ambition to embark on a career in the NHL, he signed a one-year, two-way contract with the Washington Capitals on 1 September 2018. On 7 December, with Shumakov unable to earn a recall to the NHL and having registered four points in 10 games with AHL affiliate, the Hershey Bears, the Capitals mutually terminated the contract with Shumakov. He was quickly signed as a free agent to a professional try-out to continue in the AHL, agreeing with the Springfield Thunderbirds, affiliate to the Florida Panthers on 8 December. He appeared in three games, scoring one goal with the Thunderbirds before ending his tryout on December 13. Shumakov ended his North American stint and opted for an immediate return to the KHL, agreeing to a three-year contract with Avangard Omsk, on 19 December.

During the 2020–21 season, in the midst of his third season with Avangard, Shumakov registered 8 goals and 13 points through 28 games before he was traded by Omsk to Avtomobilist Yekaterinburg in exchange for financial compensation on 9 December 2020.

Career statistics

References

External links
 

1992 births
Living people
Avangard Omsk players
Avtomobilist Yekaterinburg players
Belye Medvedi Chelyabinsk players
HC CSKA Moscow players
HC Dinamo Minsk players
Hershey Bears players
Russian ice hockey right wingers
HC Sibir Novosibirsk players
Sibirskie Snaipery players
Springfield Thunderbirds players
Traktor Chelyabinsk players
Zauralie Kurgan players